Shusha is a town in Nagorno-Karabakh.

Shusha and similar may mean one of the following:

Places
Shusha fortress, a fortress around the city of Shusha
 Shusha District, a district of Azerbaijan Republic
 Shushi Province, a province in the Nagorno-Karabakh Republic

Abu Shusha 
 Abu Shusha, Palestinian Arab village in the Ramle Subdistrict of Mandatory Palestine, located 8 km southeast of Ramle. It was depopulated in May 1948.
 Abu Shusha, Palestinian Arab village in the Haifa Subdistrict. It was depopulated during the 1947–48 Civil War in Mandatory Palestine on 9 April 1948 during the Battle of Mishmar HaEmek
Ghuwayr Abu Shusha, Palestinian Arab village in the Tiberias Subdistrict. It was depopulated during the 1947–1948 Civil War in Mandatory Palestine on April 21, 1948. It was located 8 km north of Tiberias, nearby Wadi Rubadiyya.

People
 Zhu Xi (1130–1200), Confucian scholar
 Xuxa (born 1963), Brazilian entertainer
 Shusha Guppy (1935–2008), Persian folk singer

Others
 Shusha FK, Azerbaijani football club based in Baku. It represented the city of Shusha
 Shusha massacre, the mass killing of the Armenian population of Shusha and the destruction of the Armenian half of the city that followed the suppression of the Armenian revolt against the authorities of the Azerbaijan Democratic Republic in 1920